The List of shipwrecks in 1772 includes some ships sunk, wrecked or otherwise lost during 1772.

January

1 January

2 January

9 January

20 January

31 January

Unknown date

February

11 February

Unknown date

March

Unknown date

April

Unknown date

May

4 May

Unknown date

June

9 June

Unknown date

July

26 July

Unknown date

August

5 August

9 August

16 August

28 August

31 August

Unknown date

September

1 September

5 September

24 September

25 September

Unknown date

October

2 October

29 October

Unknown date

November

1 November

10 November

17 November

18 November

21 November

26 November

29 November

Unknown date

December

2 December

3 December

8 December

12 December

15 December

19 December

25 December

Unknown date

Unknown date

References

1772